Verona Park is a park located in Verona, as part of the Essex County Park System, New Jersey.

Verona Park is a  park with a lake bordered by Lakeside and Bloomfield Avenues in the southern part of Verona. This is the fifth largest park within the system.

Once an old swamp, the lake was first formed in 1814 when Doctor Gone (or Bohn) dammed the Peckman River for a grist mill. Later this lake surrounded by weeping willow trees and winding paths became an ideal location for family activities. Even before it became a county park, the public—including residents outside Verona—flocked there by way of the Bloomfield Avenue trolley, to bathe and picnic and enjoy some commercial amusements.

The first land acquisitions for the park were made in 1920. Demand for acquisition of this desirable tract had been increasing for some time, but action was delayed due to economic conditions caused by the war. To acquire part of this land owned by the Erie Railroad Company, an agreement was made allowing the RR to retain a right-of-way across the park by means of a bridge. Sketches showed a bridge with a series of high arches that spanned the lake and roadway. This bridge never materialized. Instead, the existing arched pedestrian bridge over the lake presents a quaint architectural highlight.

The landscape plans prepared by the Olmsted Brothers were approved the same year Verona Park was acquired. Actual development did not start until several years later due to court proceedings concerning condemnation of some of the land. There was no inconvenience to the public during the delay because the park was already being used for boating, bathing, skating, picnics, and band concerts.

Park features
 lake for boating and fishing
Boathouse
Ornamental bridge over the lake, popular for wedding party photographs
Children's garden
Tennis courts
Exercise equipment 
Playground
 fitness course
Bocce courts
Annual craft show
Concerts at gazebo in center of park

References

External links
Verona Park Conservancy
Essex County Parks

County parks in New Jersey
Verona, New Jersey
Parks in Essex County, New Jersey